The Swabian-Franconian Forest (also Schwäbisch-Fränkischer Wald) is a mainly forested, deeply incised upland region, 1,187 km² in area and up to , in the northeast of Baden-Württemberg. It forms natural region major unit number 108 within the Swabian Keuper-Lias Land (major unit group 10 or D58). Its name is derived from the fact that, in medieval times, the border between the duchies of Franconia and Swabia ran through this forested region. In addition, the Swabian dialect in the south transitions to the East Franconian dialect in the north here.

Hill ranges and hills 
The Swabian-Franconian Forest is divided clockwise (beginning roughly in the north) into the Waldenburg Hills, Mainhardt Forest, Limpurg and Ellwangen Hills, Virngrund, Murrhardt Forest, Löwenstein Hills, Heilbronn Hills and Sulm Plateau; in addition the valley of Weinsberger Tal, which lies between the last two uplands, is part of the region

The highest point of the Swabian-Franconian Forest is the Hohe Brach (586.4 m). Other high hills include the Hagberg (585.2 m), Hornberg (580.0 m), Hohenstein (572 m), Hohenberg (568.9 m), Hohentannen (565.4 m), Altenberg (564.7 m), Stocksberg (538.9 m), Flinsberg (534.8 m), Juxkopf (533.1 m) and Steinknickle (524.9 m).

Protections 

Naturpark Schwäbisch-Fränkischer Wald, or Swabian-Franconian Forest Nature Park in English, is a nature park and protected area within the Swabian-Franconian Forest. The nature park covers an area of 1,270 km², including most of the Swabian-Franconian Forest, but also large areas of adjacent cultural landscapes and historical monuments.

Gallery 

Naturpark Schwäbisch-Fränkischer Wald

Literature 
 
 LUBW Landesanstalt für Umwelt, Messungen und Naturschutz Baden-Württemberg (publ.): Naturführer Schwäbischer Wald. (Reihe Naturschutz-Spectrum. Gebiete, Vol. 29). verlag regionalkultur, Ubstadt-Weiher, 2007, .

References

External links 

 
 Landscape fact file for the Swabian-Franconian Forest by the Bundesamt für Naturschutz, at bfn.de
 Detailed LUBW natural regional map at Basis by google.maps (Open "Natur und Landschaft")
 Swabian-Franconian Forest Nature Park (official homepage)

Regions of Baden-Württemberg
!